The 1956 Wightman Cup was the 28th edition of the annual women's team tennis competition between the United States and Great Britain. It was held at the All England Lawn Tennis and Croquet Club in London in England in the United Kingdom.

References

Wightman Cups by year
Wightman Cup, 1956
Wightman Cup
Wightman Cup
Wightman Cup
Wightman Cup